Eurotatoria is a superclass of rotifers.

References 

 Ridder M. De 1957a Onderzoekingen over brakwaterrotatorien. I. Assenede. (Biol. Jaarb. 195, 89-131, 11 tab.)
 Ridder M. De 1957b Onderzoekingen over brakwaterrotatorien. II. Het Zwin to Knokke. (Natuurw. Tijdschr. 39, 109-126, pl I.)

External links 
 

 
Superclasses (biology)